Prior Scientific Instruments Ltd  was established in London in 1919 as a manufacturer of optical microscopes.  It is the last traditional microscope manufacturer of makers such as Vickers, W.Watson and Son, Baker, Charles Perry, Cooke, Troughton & Simms and many others who have ceased to produce microscopes.

History

Early history 
W. R. Prior & Co. Ltd. was founded by Walter Robert Prior in 1919. The Blitz in 1941 destroyed the factory building, so the company moved to their new facility in Bishop Stortford in 1942. Many records and a collection of microscopes from the early days of the company were lost in a fire in 1988, but some illustrated catalogs have survived which give an indication of the range of  instruments produced by W. R. Prior over the years.

W. R. Prior & Co. Ltd's offices were originally located at 9,10,11 Eagle Street, Holborn, London and later at 28a Devonshire Street, London  W.1. Little is known about the Company during this time, and no records or catalogues exist as to when and why they began to produce microscopes under the Prior name.

A W. R. Prior to catalogue of microscopes and accessories dated February 1950 gives the location of the office as Devonshire Street and the factory as Bishop's Stortford, Herts. England (13 Northgate End) where manufacturing was carried out from 1942-1957.

Wartime 
The Eagle Street factory was destroyed during the London Blitz and the company relocated to 13 Northgate End, Bishop Stortford. Herts. The building was a garage and work began producing  optical gun sights, tank periscopes, and range finders for the Ministry of Defence. No microscopes were produced during the war.

The first post-war abridged catalogue includes a wood block illustration of a student “C” limb microscope, with the limb engraved with the Eagle Street address.

Post-war 
On 10 January 1947 Walter Robert Prior died at the age of 55.

1953 brought the start of manufacturing micromanipulators for Prior, and later the micropositioner was developed. Both of these are still made.

The company relocated to a new factory at London Road, Bishop Stortford in 1956 and continued to produce and develop microscopes. Because of the need for new universities and colleges during the post-war period, there was a demand for microscopes and accessories and Prior developed instruments for this market. The Science Master Microscope, introduced in 1957, was used in schools. The established Prior Monocular Dissecting Microscope was supplied for educational use. 

For the Imperial Cancer Research Fund in London, 1962, Prior supplied a Modular Inverted Microscope housed in a temperature controlled cabinet for cell culture examination. The provision of a cine camera enabled continuous or time-lapse cine-photography to be carried out. The Cinemicroscope was adaptable for still photography or closed circuit television. This microscope was one of the fore-runners of the modern inverted microscope - now such an essential tool in cell biology and tissue culture work. A Prior Tissue Culture Chamber was also supplied and enabled work to be carried out when using an inverted or standard erect microscope.

1970 - present day 
In 1978 W.R.Prior & Co.Ltd. was acquired by The Gwyndann Group of Companies and the name of the company was changed in 1979 to that of Prior Scientific Instruments Ltd.

In 1981 Prior Scientific Instruments Ltd. merged with James Swift and Son Ltd. James Swift & Son was founded in 1854 producing student and research polarising microscopes. The Swift Point Counter complimented the polarising microscope range and was sold worldwide. The James Swift factory was initially at Basingstoke, Hants. this was closed after a year and the company joined Prior Scientific Instruments at London Road, Bishop's Stortford.

In 1981 Prior launched a modular series of stereomicroscopes-the S2000 series. The intention was that this instrument would replace and upgrade the Stereomaster microscope. The design had been based on that of an operating microscope featuring a long working distance, it also had a tumbler rotating magnification system and a common objective. The design was a complete deviation from that of the previous Prior Greenough type microscope.

Fire at the Bishop Stortford factory in 1988 meant the company had to relocate to its present site in Fulbourn, Cambridge, England, offering precision mechanical engineering, optics, electronics and precision assembly.

Expanding its operation further the company opened a new office in 1991, Prior Scientific Inc, based in Rockland near Boston USA, in 2008 Prior GMBH in Jena, Germany, in 2010 Prior KK in Tokyo, Japan and in 2018 Prior China in Suzhou China.

The company continues to manufacture in the UK and has renewed emphasis on OEM projects. The company celebrated its 100-year anniversary in 2019.

Products 
 Microscope Automation products that includes motorised microscope stages, automated focus mechanisms, filter wheels, shutters, illumination systems and automated slide loading systems.
 OEM Solutions for customised design, manufacturing and assembly.
 Optical Microscopy products
 Telecommunications products such as microscopes for the inspection of fibre optic connectors in the field and in production environments.

Notes and references

Electronics companies of the United Kingdom
Manufacturing companies established in 1919
British brands
Equipment semiconductor companies
Instrument-making corporations
Companies based in London
Microscope components
Microscopy organizations
Imaging